The 1884–85 season was the 12th season of competitive football in Scotland. This season saw three further additions to the list of regional competitions with the inaugural playing of the Dumbartonshire Cup, the Linlithgowshire Cup and the Perthshire Cup.

Honours

Cup honours

National

County

Other

Scotland national team

Notes

References

External links
Scottish Football Historical Archive

 
Seasons in Scottish football